Matías Recio (born 24 January 1980 in Argentina) is an Argentinean footballer.

References

Argentine footballers
Living people
Association football forwards
1980 births
Sportivo Italiano footballers
Club Atlético Brown footballers
Guaraní Antonio Franco footballers
Sarmiento de Resistencia footballers